Robert Byng (1703–1740) was a British Navy official and Whig politician who sat in the House of Commons from 1728 to 1739. He served as Governor of Barbados for a short time before he died there.
   
Byng was baptised on 27 November 1703, the third son of George Byng, 1st Viscount Torrington and his wife Margaret Master.  He married Elizabeth Forward, daughter of Jonathan Forward, contractor of transports, on 19 December 1734.
 
Byng became cashier of the navy in 1726 and was elected Member of Parliament (MP) for Plymouth on the Admiralty interest at a by-election on 1 March 1728. He voted with the Government in all recorded divisions. In 1732 he was promoted to Commissioner of the Navy and held the post until 1739. He was returned unopposed for Plymouth at the 1734 British general election. He spoke against a place bill on 22 April 1735. In May 1739, he was appointed Governor of Barbados and resigned his seat in Parliament.

Byng died in Barbados on 6 October 1740 and was buried there on the 7th. He left three sons and his eldest son, George Byng later of Wrotham Park, was the father of John Byng, 1st Earl of Strafford. Byng was the brother of Hon. John Byng and Hon. Pattee Byng.

References

1703 births
1740 deaths
Governors of Barbados
Members of the Parliament of Great Britain for Plymouth
Younger sons of viscounts
British MPs 1727–1734
British MPs 1734–1741
Robert